Chamankot is a village in Dhirkot tehsil, Bagh District, Azad Kashmir, Pakistan. It is situated  up the hills from Kohala on the Azad Kashmir Bagh Road.

Chamankot has orchards of apples, apricots, and nuts. It has a large supply of natural spring water that serves as a source of drinking water for adjacent villages.

History
Chamankot possesses some historical value because the ancestors of the Abbasi & Hashmi Qureshi family present in this region first came to this village after their long migration from Iraq in the late 16th century. Chamankot is a very famous village due to its high peaks, pleasant weather and natural spring water which attracts tourists in the area one can have very beautiful scenic view from Pearl Continental hotel Bhurban Murree. It is also a gateway to Bagh city.

Chamankot is also famous for its cricketing history. Lucky Abbasi Chamankot is the club which represents village in local tournaments. There has been a continuous decline in sports in this village now, as land designated for ground is under the control of principal of inter college who is selling gross to earn money and not letting youngster dwell in games.

Demographics 
Abbasi, Hashmi and Janjua are the prominent clans of the village.

Most of the population found in the region of Murree and Bagh are members of the Abbasi family. In the mid-17th century the population in the village started to increase a great deal, so part of the family (the nephews of Chand Khan) migrated to the other side of the Jhelum River, in the areas of Bakot and Aliot.

Places of Interest 
The grave of Chand Khan, the predecessor of the Abbasies of this region, is in Chamankot. 

The village has a National Bank of Pakistan branch, a post office and medical facilities, including a medical store called Anayat Medical Store. There is a Government High School and Inter college in the village. Chamankot has a mosque designed by Haji Ali Roshan Khan and built by local community members under his supervision.

There is no public transportation available, and villagers must rent taxis to visit Kari Padar.

Bagh District